Ota Fukárek (born 18 January 1977) is a retired tennis player from Czech Republic.

Singles titles

Wins (4)

Runners-up (3)

Doubles titles

Wins (15)

Runners-up (11)

External links
 
 

1977 births
Living people
Czech male tennis players
Sportspeople from Jablonec nad Nisou